Viking Stadion (currently named SR-Bank Arena for sponsorship purposes), is a football stadium in Stavanger, Norway. It was inaugurated in May 2004 and cost 160 million NOK (€20 million) to build. 50 million NOK, plus the lot it was built on, was a gift from the municipality. It replaced Stavanger Stadion as the home stadium of Viking FK.

In 2006, the stadium was expanded beyond the original capacity of 15,300 to 16,600. The capacity was later reduced to 16,300 in 2012 to make room for two giant screens. From 2018 the capacity is again reduced to 15,900.

Originally an all-seater stadium, parts of the west stand have been converted to safe standing in recent years.

The record attendance is 16,600 from 24 June 2007, when Viking met Brann.

Jåttåvågen railway station, which serves the Jæren Commuter Rail, is located right outside the stadium.

The venue has hosted the Norway national under-21 football team on four occasions, playing 1–0 against Spain on 31 May 2006, 1–1 against Bosnia and Herzegovina on 6 September 2006, 2–2 against Slovakia on 10 June 2009 and 2–2 against Belgium on 10 November 2011.

In a 2012 survey carried out by the Norwegian Players' Association among away-team captains, Viking Stadion was found to be the league's fourth-best stadium, with a score of 4.27 on a scale from one to five.

In 2015, it was decided to replace the natural grass surface of the stadium with artificial grass. The new surface was installed in March 2018.

In April 2018, the stadium was renamed SR-Bank Arena following a sponsorship deal with SpareBank 1 SR-Bank.

The stadium can also host large music concerts and events. Among the artists who have played at Viking Stadion are Bryan Adams, R.E.M., Roger Waters, Bob Dylan, Sissel Kyrkjebø & Plácido Domingo, The Eagles, Kiss, Robbie Williams, Ylvis and Bon Jovi.

Attendance

Future expansion

In 2009, Viking planned a further permanent expansion of the stadium. By adding a new upper tier to the south and east stands, the capacity would be increased to 22,000. The plan was to have the expansion completed by 2016.

A decline in Viking's attendances did not deter plans in 2010. Local politicians were skeptical about the expansion, but decided to commence a formal planning process. By 2012, a continuing decline in attendances had made it obvious that the plans were not immediately viable.

References

Football venues in Norway
Eliteserien venues
Sports venues completed in 2004
2004 establishments in Norway
Sports venues in Stavanger
Viking FK